Micrornebius is a genus of crickets (Orthoptera: Ensifera) in the subfamily Mogoplistinae, tribe Mogoplistini.

The recorded distribution of species is primarily Asian and includes: India, Indo-China, Hainan, Taiwan and western Malesia.  However, M. lesnei occurs in Mozambique.

Species
A key to species of Micrornebius is given by Tan; the Orthoptera Species File lists:
 Micrornebius annandalei (Chopard, 1924)
 Micrornebius aquilus Gorochov, 1992
 Micrornebius cylindricus Ingrisch, 2006
 Micrornebius distinctus Tan, 2014
 Micrornebius eclipsus Tan, 2014
 Micrornebius gracilicornis Chopard, 1969 – type species (type locality Depok, Java)
 Micrornebius hainanensis Yin, 1998
 Micrornebius incertus (Ingrisch, 1998)
 Micrornebius inopinatus Ingrisch, 2006
 Micrornebius insularis Ingrisch, 2006
 Micrornebius kopisua Tan & Ingrisch, 2013
 Micrornebius laem Ingrisch, 2006
 Micrornebius lesnei (Chopard, 1935)
 Micrornebius lineatus Ingrisch, 2006
 Micrornebius malaya Tan & Kamaruddin, 2013
 Micrornebius mandai Tan, 2014
 Micrornebius maninjau Ingrisch, 2006
 Micrornebius perrarus Yang & Yen, 2001
 Micrornebius spadiceus Gorochov, 1994

References

External links
 

Ensifera genera
Crickets
Orthoptera of Asia